The Ferguson Gas Station is a historic automotive service station at Center Street and United States Route 65 in Marshall, Arkansas.  It is a small single-story structure, with sandstone walls and brick quoining at the corners and openings.  It has a steeply pitched gable roof, with a slightly projecting cross gable above the entrance.  The station was built about 1927 by Zeb Ferguson, in a style first popularized by the Pure Oil Company.

The building was listed on the National Register of Historic Places in 1993.

See also
National Register of Historic Places listings in Searcy County, Arkansas

References

Gas stations on the National Register of Historic Places in Arkansas
Buildings and structures in Searcy County, Arkansas
National Register of Historic Places in Searcy County, Arkansas